Tech Declare is an international satellite and terrestrial television equipment manufacturer based in London, England, that was founded in 2000.

Tech Declare sells satellite channel receiving equipment such as set-top boxes, DVB-S and DVB-T receivers, personal video recorders and aerials. Their receivers are often bought to receive European, Arabic and Asian channels not found on set top boxes designed for Sky and Freesat services, picking up channels from Hotbird 1, Turksat 3A and Astra 1.

Consumer electronics retailers of the United Kingdom